Route 10 is a numbered state highway connector in the U.S. state of Rhode Island, traveling along the Huntington Expressway, the first freeway in the state. It connects Route 12 (Park Avenue) on the Cranston–Providence city line with Interstate 95 (I-95), U.S. Route 6 (US 6), and Memorial Boulevard in downtown Providence, passing just east of the Olneyville area of Providence. It provides an alternate route to I-95 south of downtown, and connects it with the US 6 freeway west from Olneyville towards I-295 and Connecticut.

Route description

Route 10 begins at an incomplete interchange with Route 12 (Park Avenue) on the Cranston-Providence border. The bridge that carries Route 12 over Route 10 has enough space for a four-lane freeway underneath, but only the ramp from Route 12 east to Route 10 north passes under it. Until around 2000, the ramp from Route 10 south to Route 12 east instead passed under the bridge; that movement is now made with a left turn onto Route 12. There were once plans to extend Route 10 south, in conjunction with an eastern extension of the Route 37 freeway.

Route 10 heads north through Providence, turning west before crossing U.S. Route 1 (Elmwood Avenue) at a partial interchange. There is no ramp to Route 10 south, and traffic exiting from Route 10 north must turn north on US 1. After crossing US 1, Route 10 crosses over Amtrak's Northeast Corridor and enters Cranston.

Route 10 crosses Interstate 95 at a full interchange, sometimes known as the "Friendly Interchange" for the community of Quakers it partially destroyed. It then heads northwest, crossing under Pontiac Avenue and then junctioning Route 2 (Reservoir Avenue) just after crossing back into Providence. After the Route 2 interchange, Route 10 again crosses back into Cranston, running west of the parallel Niantic Avenue, which is on the city line. The final crossing, back into Providence, is just after the Cranston Street interchange, where Niantic Avenue ends.

Upon crossing into Providence Route 10 passes over and parallels the Northeast Corridor as well as interchanging with Huntington Avenue. From this interchange north to Olneyville, Huntington Avenue was upgraded to become the Huntington Expressway. Within this stretch of expressway, there is only one interchange (Union Avenue).

The junction and merge with U.S. Route 6 at Olneyville is part of the Olneyville Bypass, the first freeway in Rhode Island. The current interchange does not conform to modern highway standards, such as curve radii (US 6 east to route 10 north), exit only lanes (both US 6 east lanes upon exiting of the curved ramp onto route 10 north), and no direct access from route 10 north to US 6 west (access is provided by a U-turn ramp onto route 10 south via Tobey street, a local street). Long term plans of RIDOT involve reconfiguration of this interchange.

The combined Route 10 and US 6 - known as the Route 6-10 Connector - is the newest part of the Huntington Expressway. It heads northeast and east from Olneyville, interchanging with Dean Street (which provides access to Providence Place Mall). East of Dean Street, the freeway ends at a complicated interchange with Interstate 95. Route 10 ends there, while US 6 turns south with I-95 to reach Interstate 195. Access to downtown Providence is provided by ramps to the west end of Memorial Boulevard at Francis Street (U.S. Route 1).

On Friday, November 19, 2021, a missing connection from Route 10 north to US 6 west was completed and opened 2 years ahead of schedule.

History

Despite the first section opening in 1953, the Route 10 designation was not used until 1966, when the freeway south of Route 2 (Reservoir Avenue) opened. The 1953 section was the Olneyville Bypass (also known as the Dennis J. Roberts Expressway, now also applied to U.S. Route 6 west of the bypass). Construction began in 1950 on the bypass of the congested Olneyville neighborhood, which the east–west U.S. Route 6 and Route 14 passed through (on Westminster Street, Hartford Avenue and Plainfield Street). The bypass ran from Hartford Avenue west of Olneyville around the south and east sides of Olneyville, junctioning with Plainfield Street, Huntington Avenue, Westminster Street and Broadway, and ending at Harris Avenue northeast of Olneyville.

Once the bypass opened in 1953, it carried US 6. Eastbound US 6 exited at Westminster Street to follow its old alignment towards downtown, but westbound US 6 was completely rerouted between downtown and Olneyville, following Kinsley Avenue, Eagle Street and Harris Avenue to reach the Olneyville Bypass.

The next section, from Olneyville south to Reservoir Avenue in Cranston, was built partially along the existing Huntington Avenue, and opened in 1960. It ended at a temporary trumpet interchange with Reservoir Avenue, which at the time carried both Route 2 and Route 3. (Route 3 has since been truncated to its intersection with Route 2 in West Warwick.) Route 2 was rerouted onto the new Huntington Expressway to end at US 6 at Olneyville, while Route 3 continued to run to U.S. Route 1 in Providence.

The rest of the early Huntington Expressway, from Route 2 southeast across Interstate 95 and U.S. Route 1 to Route 12, was completed in 1966. It was then that the Route 10 designation was applied, and Route 2 was moved back to its present alignment. However, Route 10 did not end at Olneyville - it continued to the end of the bypass at Harris Avenue, and then took Harris Avenue, Eagle Street, Valley Street, River Avenue, Oneil Street, Veazie Street and Branch Avenue to end at Route 146.

The Route 12 interchange was not the planned end of the freeway; it was to continue roughly parallel to Route 117 and Route 117A, meeting Route 37 and ending near the south end of Route 117A.

For a time, Interstate 84 was planned to enter Providence via Olneyville. One plan by the state designated the Huntington Expressway south of Olneyville as Interstate 184, but this was rejected by the Federal Highway Administration.

The first section of the Route 6-10 Connector, from the east end of the Olneyville Bypass to Dean Street, opened in 1972. At that time, Route 10 was removed from its former surface alignment to a temporary end at Dean Street. The ramp it had taken northbound to Harris Avenue was cut by the new construction; the abutments for the bridge over the Northeast Corridor and northbound Harris Avenue are still in place. U.S. Route 6 westbound was not moved, continuing to enter the Olneyville Bypass from Harris Avenue. A new ramp from Tobey Street to the bypass was added, replacing a removed left entrance from Broadway. The ramp from US 6 east to Westminster Street was also closed around this time, leaving its ramp to Broadway.

The other part of the Connector opened in 1988, connecting the Huntington Expressway and Olneyville Bypass to Interstate 95 in downtown Providence. US 6 was rerouted along the Connector and I-95 to reach Interstate 195. The ramps to downtown, connecting to Memorial Boulevard, did not open until 1993, as part of the redevelopment of downtown.

Exit list
Exits were previously unnumbered, but RIDOT numbered exits between the southern terminus and the U.S. Route 6 concurrency in late 2010 to conform with federal highway standards. In 2020, RIDOT renumbered the exits as part of a statewide project to convert to mileage based numbering.

References

External links

Route 6-10 Interchange Project
2019 Highway Map, Rhode Island

Freeways in the United States
010
Transportation in Providence County, Rhode Island
Transportation in Providence, Rhode Island
U.S. Route 6